Glyphanoetus is a genus of astigs in the family Histiostomatidae.

References

Further reading

External links

 

Acariformes